Dirk Lottner (born 4 March 1972) is a German football manager and a former player who most recently was the manager of FC Energie Cottbus.

Coaching career
From 2016 to 2019, he coached 1. FC Saarbrücken.

On 11 September 2020, he was hired by FC Energie Cottbus.

Honours
 Bundesliga runner-up: 1998–99

References

External links
 
 

1972 births
Living people
German footballers
German football managers
Germany under-21 international footballers
Bundesliga players
2. Bundesliga players
Bayer 04 Leverkusen players
SC Fortuna Köln players
1. FC Köln players
1. FC Köln II players
MSV Duisburg players
Footballers from Cologne
FC Hansa Rostock managers
Association football midfielders
3. Liga managers
1. FC Saarbrücken managers
FC Energie Cottbus managers